Pontasserchio is a town in Tuscany, central Italy, administratively a frazione of the comune of San Giuliano Terme, province of Pisa. At the time of the 2001 census its population was 3,434.

Pontasserchio is about 7 km from Pisa and 4 km from San Giuliano Terme.

References 

Frazioni of the Province of Pisa